William Michael Feehan (September 29, 1929 – September 11, 2001) was a member of the Fire Department of New York who died during the collapse of the World Trade Center during the September 11 attacks. He was the second-highest official in the department.

Early life
William Feehan was born September 29, 1929 in Long Island City, Queens, and grew up in Jackson Heights.

Feehan graduated from Saint John's University in 1952. He served in the United States Army in Korea during the Korean War, during which he was decorated with the Combat Infantry Badge, Korean Service Medal, UN Service Medal and National Defense Service Medal.

Career
Feehan held every rank within the fire department, starting with Probationary Firefighter upon his appointment on October 10, 1959, and was the first firefighter to do so. He was promoted to Lieutenant in 1964 and eventually to Chief of Department in 1991. In 1992, he was appointed Deputy Fire Commissioner. Upon the resignation of Fire Commissioner Carlos M. Rivera, he briefly served as Acting Fire Commissioner through the end of Mayor David N. Dinkins administration from August 31, 1993 until December 31, 1993.

After incoming Mayor Rudolph W. Giuliani picked Howard Safir to become Fire Commissioner of the City of New York, Feehan returned to his previous position of First Deputy Fire Commissioner of the City of New York. Although high-ranking members of the FDNY and other city departments ordinarily are asked to step aside for incoming mayors to make their own appointments, according to an FDNY spokesman, this was not requested of Feehan, because he was so knowledgeable that he "was thought to know the location of every fire hydrant in the city." Feehan served in that position, the second-highest position in the department, until his death.

Personal life
Feehan lived in Flushing, Queens.

Death and legacy
On September 11, 2001, during September 11 attacks, Feehan was at a forward command post during the collapse of the North Tower of the World Trade Center, and was killed in that event. He was 71. Tom Junod, writing in Esquire magazine, wrote that surviving first responders remember Feehan admonishing a bystander who was recording individuals jumping from the building's windows, asking them "Don't you have any human decency?"

Feehan was survived by his daughters, Elizabeth Feehan and Tara Davan, and sons, William Feehan and firefighter John Feehan, who had worked in Squad Company 252 and as Captain of Engine 249. He was also survived by six grandchildren. At the National 9/11 Memorial, Feehan is memorialized at the South Pool, on Panel S-18.

In 2015 the FDNY acquired a fireboat named after Feehan.

References

External links

 
 

1929 births
2001 deaths
New York City firefighters
St. John's University (New York City) alumni
Commissioners of the New York City Fire Department
Emergency workers killed in the September 11 attacks
United States Army soldiers
American terrorism victims
Terrorism deaths in New York (state)
United States Army personnel of the Korean War
People murdered in New York City
Male murder victims
United States Army officers